Joshua Jon Cullen (born 7 April 1996) is a professional footballer who plays as a midfielder for Burnley and the Republic of Ireland national team.

Early life
Cullen was born in Westcliff-on-Sea, Essex. His grandparents on his father's side were from County Leitrim, Ireland. He played junior football for Rayleigh Boys before joining West Ham United at the age of nine. He attended St Thomas More High School.

Club career

West Ham United
Cullen was first included in a West Ham matchday squad for their Premier League fixture against Arsenal at the Emirates Stadium on 14 March 2015, remaining an unused substitute as they lost 3–0. He was also called up and unused on 9 May, as West Ham lost 1–0 at Aston Villa.

On 2 July 2015, he made his first-team debut for the club in a 3–0 home victory over Lusitanos of Andorra in the UEFA Europa League first qualifying round first leg, replacing Joey O'Brien after 60 minutes; he started in their 1–0 victory in the second leg a week later, making way for Amos Nasha after 63 minutes. With manager Slaven Bilić putting priority on the team's Premier League performance, he made an array of changes for their third qualifying round second leg away to Astra Giurgiu on 6 August, including starting Cullen in his first competitive match against a professional opponent. Twenty-three days later he made his Premier League debut, replacing Diafra Sakho at the end of a 3–0 win over Liverpool at Anfield. 

Cullen returned from loan at Bolton Wanderers in January 2018 making an appearance in the FA Cup away at Shrewsbury Town. He was praised for his performance by West Ham manager, David Moyes, in a poor performance by West Ham which ended 0–0. Cullen also had two front teeth kicked-out accidentally by Shrewsbury player Abu Ogogo.

In the summer of 2020, Cullen returned to his parent club at the end of his loan spell at Charlton Athletic, where he immediately impressed in West Ham's EFL Cup tie with Charlton. He received significant praise from manager David Moyes after the game. Before West Ham's EFL Cup fixture with Hull City on 23 September 2020, Cullen returned a positive test for COVID-19 along with manager David Moyes and teammate Issa Diop.

Loans to Bradford City
Cullen signed on loan for Bradford City in February 2016. In March 2016 his loan was extended until the end of the 2015–16 season.

On 8 August 2016, Cullen re-signed for Bradford City on a five-month loan deal. He scored his first league goal for the club in the 2–1 victory at MK Dons on 16 August 2016. His loan at the club was extended on 3 January 2017 until the end of the season.

Loan to Bolton Wanderers
On 1 August 2017, Cullen, along with West Ham teammate Reece Burke, joined Bolton Wanderers on loan until the following January.

Loan to Charlton Athletic
On 30 August 2018, Cullen joined Charlton Athletic on loan until the end of the 2018–19 season. He dislocated his shoulder on 6 November 2018 playing against Walsall, leaving the pitch in the 80th minute. He returned to the first team in January 2019 against Accrington Stanley. On 26 May 2019, Cullen played the full 90 minutes of the League One play-off final as Charlton won 2–1 to return to the Championship. Having spent the season on-loan, he returned to West Ham and played in several pre 2019–20 season friendlies. In August 2019, he returned to Charlton on-loan for the 2019–20 season.

Anderlecht
On 5 October 2020, Cullen joined Belgian First Division A side Anderlecht on a permanent deal until 30 June 2023, after fifteen years at West Ham. He sent an emotional farewell message to West Ham fans on 12 October 2020 thanking them for their support and citing Mark Noble as one of his heroes. Upon joining Anderlecht, Sporting director Peter Verbeken described Cullen as "a true team player known for his winning mentality." On 22 January 2021, Cullen captained Anderlecht for the first time in a 0–0 draw against Waasland-Beveren, in just his 13th appearance for the club.

Burnley
On 12 July 2022, Burnley signed Cullen on a three-year contract, for an undisclosed fee. He made his Burnley debut on 29 July 2022 in a 1–0 away win against Huddersfield Town. His debut performance was described by the BBC as "superb".

International career
Having already played for England U16 in 2011, He made his debut for Republic of Ireland U19 in September 2014, in a 1–0 victory against Netherlands U19. On 4 September 2015, he made his debut for Republic of Ireland U21 in a 4–1 victory against Qatar U23 in a friendly at Gigg Lane. On 25 March 2017, Cullen captained the Republic of Ireland U21s to a win 1–0 win over Kosovo U21 in a UEFA Under-21 has Championship Qualifier.

On 15 March 2019, Cullen received his first international call-up to the senior Republic of Ireland national team. He made his full debut on 10 September 2019, playing the full 90 minutes in a 3–1 win against Bulgaria.

Career statistics

International

Honours
Charlton Athletic
EFL League One play-offs: 2019

Individual
EFL League One Player of the Month: April 2017
Republic of Ireland U21 Player of the Year: 2018

References

External links

1996 births
Living people
People from Westcliff-on-Sea
Sportspeople from Essex
English footballers
England youth international footballers
Republic of Ireland association footballers
Republic of Ireland youth international footballers
Republic of Ireland under-21 international footballers
Republic of Ireland international footballers
Association football defenders
West Ham United F.C. players
Bradford City A.F.C. players
Bolton Wanderers F.C. players
Charlton Athletic F.C. players
Premier League players
English Football League players
English people of Irish descent
R.S.C. Anderlecht players
Burnley F.C. players
Expatriate footballers in Belgium
Republic of Ireland expatriate association footballers
Belgian Pro League players